"Makin' Love" is a song written and originally released by American country singer Floyd Robinson. He released it as a single in 1959.

Commercial performance 
The song became a hit on the both sides of Atlantic. In the United States it reached no. 20 on the Billboard Hot 100 and no. 27 on the Billboard Black Singles chart. In the UK it reached no. 9 on the national singles chart.

In the U.S., "Makin' Love" was controversial because of its suggestive sexual content, and many radio stations pulled it from the airwaves after only a few weeks.

Charts

Dalida version (in French) 
The song was translated into French (under the title "T'aimer follement") and recorded by two French singers: Dalida and soon then-unknown Johnny Hallyday. Both versions were released in early 1960.

Dalida's version reached no. 2 in Wallonia (French Belgium). and no. 1 in France.

Charts

Johnny Hallyday version (in French)

Track listings 
7-inch EP Vogue EPL 7750 (1960, France etc.)
 A1. "T'aimer follement" (2:30)
 A2. "J'étais fou" (2:45)
 B1. "Laisse les filles" (2:17)
 B2. "Oh, Oh Baby" (2:52)

7-inch single Vogue V. 45-722 (1960, France etc.) 
 A. "T'aimer follement" (2:27)
 B. "Laisse les filles" (2:28)

7-inch single Vogue Productions 45-4068 (Canada)
 A. "T'aimer Follement" (2:28)
 B. "J'et ais fou" (2:49)

CD single Disques Vogue 743211131712 (1993, France)
 "T'aimer follement" (2:29)
 "Nous les gars, nous les filles (1:51)

CD single "Souvenirs, Souvenirs / T'aimer follement" amc 14.002 (2000, Belgium)
 "Souvenirs, souvenirs" (2:09)
 "T'aimer follement" (2:29)

See also 
 List of number-one singles of 1960 (France)

References

External links
 Floyd Robinson – "Makin' Love" (single) at Discogs
 Johnny Hallyday – "T'aimer follement" (EP) at Discogs
 Johnny Hallyday – "T'aimer follement" (single) at Discogs

1959 songs
1959 singles
1960 singles
Number-one singles in France
Dalida songs
Floyd Robinson (singer) songs
Johnny Hallyday songs
Disques Vogue singles
RCA Records singles